Michele A. Matteini is an art historian, a specialist of Luo Ping and a scholar of late imperial China (17th-19th centuries). A graduate from the Institute of Fine Arts of the New York University, Mattini is a published author and co-curator of the show Eccentric Visions: The Worlds of Luo Ping, sponsored by Zurich's Museum Rietberg, Switzerland, which traveled to the Metropolitan Museum of Art, New York City. The New York Times called the catalogue 'superb.'
He currently lives in New York City and teaches at New York University, where he is Assistant Professor of East Asian Art, Architecture and Visual Culture.

Education 

Matteini earned his PhD in Chinese Art History at the Institute of Fine Arts, New York University, with a dissertation titled Painting in the Age of Evidential Scholarship (kaozheng): Luo Ping’s Late Years, ca. 1770-1799. His supervisor was Shitao scholar Jonathan Hay. Research for his dissertation was supported by an Ittleson Fellowship from the Center for Advanced Study in the Visual Arts, National Gallery of Art, Washington DC. From the Institute of Fine Arts he also received an M.A. and before that he obtained a laurea in Chinese Language and Literature from the Ca' Foscari University of Venice, Italy.

Academic career 
Before joining the NYU faculty, Michele Matteini has taught at Reed College and Oberlin College.
In 2013-2014 he was The Andrew W. Mellon Foundation member at the Institute for Advanced Study at Princeton.

Publications 
Eccentric visions : the worlds of Luo Ping, edited by Kim Karlsson, Alfreda Murck, and Michele Matteini. Zürich : Museum Reitberg Zürich, 2009.

"China: the empire of things" Review of Jason Steuber and Nick Pearce, Original Intentions: Essays on the Production, Reproduction, and Interpretation in the Arts of China, Gainesville, FL: University of Florida Press 2012', Journal of Art Historiography, Vol 11, 2014, pp 11-14 .
 
"On the "True Body" of Huineng: The Matter of the Miracle," RES: Anthropology and Aesthetics, 1 April 2009, Issue 55/56, pp. 42–60,

References

New York University Institute of Fine Arts alumni
New York University faculty
Reed College faculty
Oberlin College faculty
Italian art historians
1975 births
Living people
Historians of East Asian art